People awarded the Honorary citizenship of the Republic of Chechnya are:

Honorary Citizens of Chechnya
Listed by date of award:

References
 

Chechnya
Culture of Chechnya
Chechnya, Honorary citizens of